Lechenaultia expansa  is a species of flowering plant in the family Goodeniaceae and is endemic to the south-west of Western Australia. It is a prostrate to erect subshrub with wand-like branches, crowded, narrow, fleshy leaves and pale purple-blue, tube-shaped flowers.

Description

Taxonomy
Lechenaultia expansa was first formally described in 1810 by Robert Brown in his Prodromus Florae Novae Hollandiae et Insulae Van Diemen. The specific epithet (expansa) means "spread out" or "unfolded".

Distribution and habitat
This lechenaultia grows in and near swampy heath and winter-wet areas in near-coastal areas of south-western Western Australia in the Avon Wheatbelt, Jarrah Forest, Mallee, Swan Coastal Plain and Warren biogeographic regions.

References

expansa
Eudicots of Western Australia
Plants described in 1810
Taxa named by Robert Brown (botanist, born 1773)